Shiraz University of Technology (SUTech) is an accredited and well-known university in Iran, the second public university in the Fars Province in higher technological education, basic and applied research. In 2004, the Government offered technical assistance for establishing an institute of higher education in engineering in Shiraz.

Currently  the University has about 1,700 students, with five Bachelor's degree programs (B.S.), 31 Master's degree (M.S.), and 14 Ph.D. degree programs.

History
Shiraz University of Technology was established in 1968 as the Electronics Industry College, which was one of the Shiraz University branches (Electronics Engineering College). 
After 2004, it was named "Shiraz University of Technology" as an independent public university which developed by some other fields such as Chemical, Material, Mechanical, etc.

Campus
Currently there is just one campus on Moddares Blvd., Shiraz, Iran. It was announced that a new campus is building in Shahrak Sadra, Shiraz, Iran.

The campus consists of all the university's building like departments buildings, library, restaurant, mosque, gym, publication, etc. There are five department buildings:
 Faculty of Sciences building
 Electrical Engineering Department building (which have no classrooms and consists of faculties and some laboratories)
 Information Technology Department building (which merged with the chancellor's building)
 Chemical Engineering Department building (which merged with the Aerospace Engineering Department and Civil & Environmental Engineering Department and a part of the Electrical Engineering Department)
 Material Engineering Department building

Ranking 
Shiraz University of Technology is the 6th university offering engineering programs in Iran based on 2019 Times rankings  It is also 138th university in Asia and 601-800th in the world.

Faculties
The following degrees are now offered in the university training students in bachelor's and master's degrees levels:
 Aerospace Engineering (M.S. since 2010, PhD. since 2013)
 Applied Mathematics (M.S. since 2007, PhD. since 2010)
 Chemical Engineering (M.S. since 2007)
 Civil Engineering (M.S. since 2008, PhD. since 2013)
 Computer Engineering (M.S. since 2011)
 Electrical and Electronic Engineering (B.S. & M.S. since 2004, PhD. since 2010)
 Industrial Engineering (M.S. since 2011, BS. since 2012)
 Information Technology (B.S. since 2004, M.S. since 2010, PhD. since 2013)
 Material Engineering (M.S. since 2009)
 Mechanical Engineering (M.S. since 2007)
 Physics (M.S. since 2010)
 Physical Chemistry (M.S. since 2008)

Chancellors

See also
Shiraz University
Higher education in Iran

References

External links
Official website

Universities in Iran
Educational institutions established in 2004
Buildings and structures in Shiraz
Education in Shiraz
2004 establishments in Iran